Lieutenant General Danilo Errico (born 11 August 1953) is an Italian Army officer, who was Chief of Staff of the Italian Army from 27 February 2015 to 27 February 2018.

He served as Deputy Chief of the Defence Staff from February 2013 to February 2015. He became Chief of the Army on 27 February 2015 and handed over command to Lieutenant General Salvatore Farina on 27 February 2018.

References

External links

Italian generals
1953 births
Military personnel from Turin
Living people
Knights Grand Cross of the Order of Merit of the Italian Republic
Chiefs of Staff of the Italian Army